seca GmbH & Co. KG. is a German company that develops, produces and sells weighing scales and measuring instruments. It's an international market leader and, because of its high degree of specialisation, it is considered a hidden champion. Its products are exported to more than 110 countries. The company’s headquarters is in Hamburg and it has branches in Austria, France, England, Switzerland, Japan, China, Mexico, Colombia, Finland, Malaysia, United Arab Emirates, Brasil and the USA.

Foundation and history 
In 1840, locksmith A.C.C. Joachims set up on his own in Hamburg and began to build scales. He had acquired the necessary know-how from the Strasbourg mechanic and monk Quintenz who had invented the decimal scale in 1821. In the course of the next thirty years, the locksmith’s workshop developed into a small factory. However, the business stagnated when Joachims died in 1874. Things started to improve again when Frederik Vogel, a young businessman, purchased the scales' factory in 1888. He expanded the product range and introduced the brand name seca which he had registered in 1897.

The company survived World War I and the Great Depression in the 20th century, and then Frederik Vogel passed the management over to his son Robert. Robert Vogel steered the company through World War II and began with the successful reconstruction immediately after the end of the war. When Robert Vogel died in 1966, his son Sönke joined the company.

In 1970, Sönke Vogel decided in favour of a new corporate concept. Since then focus has been on medical measuring and weighing, on products which are needed for diagnosis and therapy purposes in medicine in order to determine the precise weight of a patient. The product portfolio has been consistently expanded and is available on all international markets. In 2010 the sons of Sönke Vogel, Robert and Frederik Vogel junior, joined the management board.

Corporate structure 
seca GmbH & Co. KG. has the following subsidiaries:

 seca France, Semur-en-Auxois, France
 seca United Kingdom, Birmingham, Great Britain
 seca North America West, Los Angeles, CA, USA
 seca North America East, Hanover, MD, USA 
 seca Schweiz, Reinach, Switzerland
 seca Zhong Guo, Hangzhou, China
 seca Nihon, Chiba City, Japan
 seca Mexico, Mexico City, Mexico
 seca Middle East, Dubai, United Arab Emirates
 seca Brasil, Sao Paulo, Brasil
 seca Suomi, Espoo, Finland
 seca Latin America, Bogotá, Colombia
 seca Asia Pacific, Kuala Lumpur, Malaysia

Products 
The range includes:

 Baby scales
 Column scales
 Flat scales
 Multifunction and wheelchair scales
 Bed and dialysis scales
 Height measuring and measuring instruments
 Medical Body Composition Analyzer

References 

Medical technology companies of Germany
German brands
Companies based in Hamburg
Weighing scale manufacturers